Mohamed Tarek (born 19 October 1989) is an Egyptian professional footballer who plays as a right back for the Egyptian club Alassiouty Sport. In 2017, Tarek signed a 2-year contract for Al-Assiouty in a free agent transfer from Petrojet.

References

External links
Mohamed Tarek at KOOORA.com
Mohamed Tarek at Footballdatabase

1989 births
Living people
Egyptian footballers
Egyptian Premier League players
Association football defenders
Pyramids FC players
Petrojet SC players
El Entag El Harby SC players